Norman Leslie Sloan Jr. (June 25, 1926 – December 9, 2003) was an American college basketball player and coach. Sloan was a native of Indiana and played college basketball and football at North Carolina State University. He began a long career as a basketball coach months after graduating from college in 1951, and he was the men's basketball head coach at Presbyterian College, The Citadel, North Carolina State University, and two stints as at the University of Florida. Over a career that spanned 38 seasons, Sloan was named conference coach of the year five times and won the 1974 national championship at North Carolina State, his alma mater. He was nicknamed "Stormin' Norman" due to his combative nature with the media, his players, and school administrators, and his collegiate coaching career ended in controversy when Florida's basketball program was under investigation in 1989, though Sloan claimed that he was treated unfairly.

Early years
Sloan was born in Anderson, Indiana in 1926 to Norman and Mary Sloan. He attended Lawrence Central High School in Indianapolis, where he lettered in basketball.

College playing career
Sloan received an athletic scholarship to attend North Carolina State University in Raleigh, North Carolina, where he played guard for coach Everett Case's NC State Wolfpack from 1946 to 1949.  He was one of Case's original six "Hoosier Hotshots," a group of high school stars Case recruited from Indiana.  As a member of the Wolfpack, Sloan was a classmate and teammate of Vic Bubas, who later coached the Duke Blue Devils from 1959 to 1969.  Sloan was a member of three Wolfpack teams that won Southern Conference championships in 1947, 1948 and 1949. During the fall semesters, he played on the NC State Wolfpack football team as a reserve quarterback and was a member of the school's track and field team.

Sloan quit the basketball team before his senior year (1950–51) due to an ongoing dispute with Case over playing time. On the football field, he became the backup to starting quarterback Ed Mooney and appeared in most games under coach Beattie Feathers. Sloan graduated from NC State with a bachelor's degree in education in 1951.

Coaching career

Presbyterian
Soon after graduating from NC State in 1951, Sloan was hired at Presbyterian College in Clinton, South Carolina to be the school's head basketball coach and an assistant football coach starting with the 1951 fall semester. He led the basketball team from 1951 to 1955, and his Presbyterian Blue Hose men's basketball teams compiled a 69–36 record in four seasons, including conference championships and berths in the NAIA Men's Basketball Championship Tournament in his first and last seasons at the school.

Memphis State (assistant)
Sloan left for Memphis State University in 1955 to serve as an assistant for the Memphis Tigers under head coach Eugene Lambert. The Tigers went 20-7 during Sloan's single season at the school and earned the program's first berth in the NCAA tournament.

The Citadel
In 1956, Sloan was named the head coach at The Citadel in Charleston, South Carolina to take over a basketball program which had won a total of two games over the previous two seasons. His first Bulldogs team in 1957 went 11-14 and won the George Mikan Award for Most Improved Team in the Nation, and Sloan was named the coach of the year by the South Carolina Sportswriters Association. The Citadel posted winning seasons over the next three years and made their first appearance in the Southern Conference championship game in 1959. Sloan's overall record at the school was 57–38.

Florida
In 1960, Sloan was hired as the first full-time basketball coach at the University of Florida, where an assistant football coach had usually been assigned to coach basketball due to the school's lack of emphasis on the sport up to that time. His Florida Gators men's basketball teams tallied an 85–63 record in six seasons, including the school's first victory over an Adolph Rupp-coached Kentucky Wildcats team in 1965.  He was unable to get the Gators into postseason play during this time; during the 1960s, only one team per conference was guaranteed an NCAA bid.  Nonetheless, he built a foundation for a basketball program that had been, according to Florida historian Norm Carlson, "essentially an intramural program playing at the intercollegiate level." The Miami Herald dubbed Sloan the "father of UF hoops" for his achievements in the 1960s.

North Carolina State
Sloan was named head coach at his alma mater, North Carolina State, in 1966, and his NC State Wolfpack basketball teams won three Atlantic Coast Conference (ACC) Championships in 1970, 1973 and 1974.  His 1973 Wolfpack team was undefeated (27–0) but missed that year's NCAA tournament due to questions about the recruiting of high school phenomenon David Thompson.  A year later, he led the Wolfpack to a 30–1 record and the school's first NCAA national championship. En route, the Wolfpack defeated the UCLA Bruins in the NCAA Final Four, ending UCLA coach John Wooden's run of seven straight NCAA championships.  Sloan's Wolfpack beat Marquette, 76–64, in the 1974 NCAA championship game.

Sloan's overall win–loss record at NC State was 266–127 in 14 seasons.  His greatest teams included legendary players such as Thompson, Tommy Burleson, Moe Rivers, Tim Stoddard (who went on to pitch in Major League Baseball), Kenny Carr, and Monte Towe.  "Stormin' Norman" was as well known for his garish red-and-white plaid sports coat as he was for his ACC battles with Lefty Driesell at Maryland and Dean Smith at North Carolina. He was selected the National Coach of the Year in 1973 by Basketball Weekly, and again in 1974 by the USBWA and the Associated Press.

Great Britain national team
Sloan was named head coach of the Great Britain men's national basketball team ahead of the 1980 Olympic qualifying campaign. Sloan, who had just been rehired by the University of Florida, hosted a month-long training camp for the Great Britain national team on Florida's campus in Gainesville. He then took the team to England for a series of preparation games against Finland and Belgium before competing in the Vienna Tournament in Austria and the European Olympic Qualifying Tournament in Switzerland. Great Britain finished Olympic Qualifying with a 1–3 record and a 5–6 (.455) overall international record for the summer. Sloan was succeeded as the Great Britain National Team head coach by Tom Schneeman.

Return to Florida
A salary dispute with the athletic director at NC State caused Sloan to leave the school, and the construction of the modern O'Connell Center basketball arena at the University of Florida helped convince Sloan to return to Gainesville in 1980. After three losing seasons, he turned the Florida Gators basketball program around for a second time, primarily by convincing several top in-state high school recruits such as Vernon Maxwell and Dwayne Schintzius to attend college at Florida. From 1984 through 1989, Sloan's Gators posted winning records in six straight campaigns and made the first six postseason tournament appearances in program history when they were invited to the NIT Tournament in 1984, 1985, and 1986 and the NCAA Tournament 1987, 1988, and 1989. Sloan's last three squads each won over 20 games, which had previously been accomplished only once at Florida, and his final team won the school's first Southeastern Conference regular season basketball championship.

Sloan compiled a 150–131 record over nine seasons in his second stint at Florida, giving him an overall record of 235–194 in 15 years with the Gators.

Resignation
Sloan was forced to retire on October 31, 1989, just days before the start of the 1989–90 season and one year before his previously announced retirement date, in the wake of an NCAA investigation into the Gators program.

In September 1990, the NCAA imposed two years' probation on the Gators for violations dating back to 1985 under Sloan. The Gators' 1987 and 1988 NCAA Tournament appearances were erased from the record books due to Maxwell being retroactively declared ineligible; Maxwell had admitted to taking money from agents without Sloan's knowledge. Sloan had also purchased a plane ticket to Boston for Maxwell in the summer of 1987 so that Maxwell could serve as a counselor at a basketball camp. Two years earlier, one of Sloan's assistants had allowed a recruit's mother to use the return leg of the recruit's airline ticket to return home after the recruit enrolled in summer school. In the NCAA's view, this amounted to the university paying for the travel expenses of recruits and players. It also harshly criticized Sloan, finding that he had engaged in unethical conduct by paying Maxwell's airfare. The basketball program lost two scholarships in 1991-92 and one scholarship in 1992-93 because of the infractions. As severe as these penalties were, the NCAA said it would have imposed even harsher penalties, such as a ban from postseason play and live television in 1990–91, had Sloan not been forced out. Sloan was personally penalized with a five-year show-cause penalty, which had the effect of blackballing him from the collegiate coaching ranks until 1995 at the earliest.

Later, Sloan stated that the situation was "mishandled". In a 1990 interview, Sloan stated his belief that UF athletic director Bill Arnsparger and other university officials "panicked" over relatively minor issues in the basketball program due to recent major violations in other sports (Florida's football team was placed on NCAA probation twice in the 1980s), and that the fear of being levied a "death penalty" caused them to overreact and demand his resignation. He also claimed that the university's athletic compliance office was partially to blame for his "unconscious" violations of NCAA travel rules because his requests "went through the channels of athletic administration at the university unquestioned." Overall, he said, "The findings certainly don`t justify what has happened... My reputation was completely destroyed and the careers of two young, promising assistants (Monte Towe and Kenny McCraney, who were also forced to resign) were destroyed. That`s tragic, and the university worked hard at getting it done."

Awards and accomplishments
Sloan's career win–loss record was 627–395, and his victory total ranks him twenty-sixth on the career list of Division I coaches.  His 266 wins at NC State are still second in NC State history, trailing only Case. His 235 wins at Florida (232 if vacated games aren't counted) were the best in Florida history until Billy Donovan surpassed him in 2006.

Sloan was inducted into the Indiana Basketball Hall of Fame in 1984, the North Carolina Sports Hall of Fame in 1994, the Citadel Athletic Hall of Fame in 2002, and the North Carolina State University Athletic Hall of Fame in 2013.

After coaching
Sloan coached briefly in Greece after leaving Florida, then he retired in Raleigh, North Carolina. He died of complications related to pulmonary fibrosis on December 9, 2003 at Duke University Medical Center in Durham, North Carolina. He was survived by his wife Joan, son Mike, and daughters Leslie and Debbie.

Head coaching record

Basketball

* NCAA appearances in 1987 and 1988 were subsequently vacated due to Vernon Maxwell being declared ineligible.  Official record for 1986-87 is 21-10, official record for 1987-88 is 22-11.
& Record at Florida is 232-192 (147-129 for second stint) without vacated games.

See also 

 The Citadel Bulldogs
 Florida Gators
 History of the University of Florida
 List of college men's basketball coaches with 600 wins
 List of NCAA Division I Men's Final Four appearances by coach
 List of North Carolina State University people
 NC State Wolfpack
 University Athletic Association
 Hotel Roosevelt fire

References

Bibliography 

Dortch, Chris,  String Music: Inside the Rise of SEC Basketball, Brassey's, Inc., Dulles, Virginia (2002).  .
Koss, Bill, Pond Birds: Gator Basketball, The Whole Story From The Inside, Fast Break Press, Gainesville, Florida (1996).  .
Peeler, Tim,  Legends of NC State Basketball, Sports Publishing L.L.C., Champaign, Illinois (2004).  .

Great Britain men's national basketball team coaches
1926 births
2003 deaths
American football quarterbacks
American men's basketball players
American people of English descent
Basketball coaches from Indiana
Basketball players from Indianapolis
College men's basketball head coaches in the United States
Florida Gators men's basketball coaches
Guards (basketball)
Memphis Tigers men's basketball coaches
Memphis Tigers track and field coaches
NC State Wolfpack football players
NC State Wolfpack men's basketball coaches
NC State Wolfpack men's basketball players
NC State Wolfpack men's track and field athletes
Players of American football from Indianapolis
Presbyterian Blue Hose men's basketball coaches
Sportspeople from Anderson, Indiana
The Citadel Bulldogs basketball coaches
Track and field athletes from Indianapolis